Jean Esme Oregon Cooke RA (18 February 1927 – 6 August 2008) was an English painter of still lifes, landscapes, portraits and figures. She was a lecturer at the Royal Academy and regularly exhibited her works, including the summer Royal Academy exhibitions. She was commissioned to make portraits by Lincoln College and St Hilda's College, Oxford. Her works are in the National Gallery, Tate and the Royal Academy collections. In the early years of her marriage, she signed her works Jean Bratby.

Early life
Jean Esme Oregon Cooke was born on 18 February 1927 in South London to Arthur Oregon Cooke and his wife. Arthur owned a shop in Blackheath, London where he sold hardware supplies and groceries. Until she was about  years old, Cooke spent a lot of time in her father's shop. Her mother saw little value in education and kept her out of school until then. Her mother had an artistic spirit, creating "beautiful colours to decorate the walls by subtly mixing odd touches of paint." As a young girl she drew, painted and modeled figures and heads in plasticine. She attended Blackheath High School.

Early adulthood
Cooke began her art studies in 1943 at the Central School of Arts and Crafts. She studied life drawing under Bernard Meninsky, textile design, and illustration at the Central School until 1945. Cooke then studied sculpture at Goldsmiths College and pottery at Camberwell College of Arts. Interested in becoming a teacher, she enrolled in the teacher education course at Goldsmiths, which she completed in 1950.

Initially, Cooke was most interested in pursuing sculpture, partly because oils were expensive and clay was free at the college. One of her works won a prize, but after suffering a biking accident where she had dislocated her thumb, she worked in pottery. In 1950 she established a pottery workshop in Sussex.

John Bratby, a Royal College of Art painter, and Cooke began a tempestuous dating relationship. Bratby, afraid that she might leave him, locked her in his room once during their courtship. In April 1953 they were married and she took his last name. Later that year she entered the Royal College's post graduate program. Cooke's interest in painting grew under the tutelage of Ruskin Spear, Rodrigo Moynihan, and Carel Weight.

In 1964 she had her first solo exhibition at Leicester Galleries. She developed a following, including Bethel Solomons and Brinsley Ford who collected her regularly exhibited works. Bratby did not achieve the recognition that his wife received and he was upset by it, which made their relationship increasingly difficult. He often painted over or "slashed" her works and restricted her painting time to three morning hours. Bratby had affairs and was physically abusive and cruel. He was said, though, to have had an "enlivening, inspiring effect" on her artistically.

Career
In 1964 she began teaching students to paint at the Royal College. The following year the Royal Academy made her an associate member and in 1972 she was made a full member. She lectured at the college until 1974. During the summers she exhibited her works at the Royal Academy exhibition. The seascape at her cottage and the landscape surrounding her Edwardian mansion featured in her paintings: "cherry trees in full bloom, long grass filled with buttercups and blue-flowering lungwort, or the dark evergreens lit by the house windows at night. Doves were favourite models and appeared frequently." She made self-portraits, paintings of her husband; and portraits. She was commissioned by St Hilda's College, Oxford to paint its principal, Mary Bennett and was hired by Lincoln College to make portraits of Walter Oakeshott and Egon Wellesz. In the early 1980s she painted a full-length portrait of her next-door neighbor, the baroque cellist Richard Webb. Her works reflected sensitivity, beauty, and insight - made with a "subtle, understated, individual sense of colour." Piet Mondrian was one of her favourite artists. Her work has been compared to Gwen John and Paula Modersohn-Becker.

Cooke made several self-portraits, like Blast Bodicea, Jamais je ne pleure et jamais je ne ris (I never cry and I never laugh), and Self-Portrait (Tate). Her self-portraits often reflected humour to counterbalance the candid and not particularly flattering works. In them she was always searching for something, "the previously unperceived." Cooke commented that she had different motivations, sometimes wanting to be alone, or to be acknowledge, or to show off. Blast Bodicea was made at the urging of her husband, John Bratby, who had given her a heavy brass fireman's helmet to be included in the work. Although it became too difficult to paint while wearing the helmet, there are faint traces of the helmet visible in the painting.

Bratby and Cooke's relationship experienced cycles of violence throughout their marriage. Jean left their home in fear, but would return based on the advice of their mentor and family friend, Carel Weight. She began signing her works with her maiden name at Bratby's insistence. The couple had one daughter, Wendy, and three sons, Dayan, David, Jason. They were all artistic. The family shared their time between two houses. One was a seaside cottage at Birling Gap and the other was a large, cold Edwardian manor, which had tennis courts, a swimming pool and a largely untended garden. The couple's relationship was over by the 1970s, and they divorced in 1977.

Starting in 1974 Cooke held "open studios" for the Greenwich Festival, something she continued until 1994. Her works are at the National Gallery, Tate and the Royal Academy.

Later years
In 2003, her house caught fire, many of her paintings were lost, and the building was destroyed. She moved into a Charlton Village flat and continued her painting there. She died on 6 August 2008 at her second cottage at Birling Gap while looking at the sea out of her window. The cause of death was pneumonia.

Andrew Lambirth wrote of her in the days following her death:

Friend and playwright Nell Dunn wrote that she had "a crazy sense of humour - she sees herself as a comic character in a comic world, with the only serious thing being painting."

Professional organisations
Cooke became a Full Royal Academician in 1972, and for many years her work has appeared annually in the Royal Academy's Summer Exhibition. She was on the Council of the Royal Academy in 1983 to 1985, 1992 to 94, and 2001 to 2002. In 1993 and 1994, she was a Senior hanger at the Royal Academy.

From 1984 to 1986, Cooke was governor of the Central School of Art and Design. She sat on the academic board of the Blackheath School of Art from 1986 to 1988. She was a member of the Friends of Woodlands Art Gallery.

Works
A selection of her works include:

 Birth of Icarus, 1998, Piano Nobile Fine Paintings
 Blast Boadicea, oil on canvas, 1960, Royal Academy of Arts, London
 Dream Dream, 2008
 Egon Joseph Wellesz (1885-1974), Lincoln College, University of Oxford
 Grassland, Government Art Collection
 Jamais je ne pleure et jamais je ne ris (I never cry and I never laugh), oil on canvas, c. 1972, Royal Academy of Arts, London
 John Bratby (1928-1992), Royal Academy of Arts
 John Bratby (1928-1992), Royal College of Art
 Lily, Lily on the Brow, Calderdale Metropolitan Borough Council
 Mad Self Portrait, Tullie House Museum and Art Gallery
 Mary Bennett, Principal (1965-1980) St Hilda's College, University of Oxford
 Richard Webb, Baroque Cellist, c.1982, Private collection.
 Not Waving, Just Painting, Usher Gallery, The Collection: Art & Archaeology in Lincolnshire
 Portrait of a Boy, Kirklees Museums and Galleries
 Self-Portrait, Tate, 1958
 Sir Walter Oakeshott (1903-1987), Lincoln College, University of Oxford
 The greenhouse, oil on board, 1955
 The Italian Straw Hat, London Borough of Camden
 The yellow cliff, oil on canvas, 1974
 Through the Looking Glass, 1960, Royal Academy of Arts
 Union Wharf, Government Art Collection
 Young girl with parasol, oil on board

Exhibitions
Some of her exhibitions were:
 1956 - The first year her work was included in group exhibitions
 1963 - Her first solo exhibition was held at the Establishment Club in London
 1964 - Solo exhibition at the Leicester Galleries
 1965 - Bear Lane Gallery in Oxford
 1965 - Moyan Gallery, Manchester
 1971 - New Grafton Gallery, London
 1974 - Group exhibitions at Agnews
 1976 - Dulwich Picture Gallery
 1976 - "British Painting 1952 to 1977" at the Royal Academy
 1979 - Tate Gallery
 1980 - Norwich Gallery
 1990 - Sir Hugh Casson Room for Friends at the Royal Academy of Arts
 1996 - Along with Maggi Hambling, she contributed to "In The Looking Glass", an exhibition at the Usher Gallery, Lincoln, that brought together a group of contemporary self-portraits by women.

Notes

References

Further reading

External links
 

1927 births
2008 deaths
20th-century English painters
20th-century English women artists
Academics of the Royal College of Art
Alumni of Camberwell College of Arts
Alumni of Goldsmiths, University of London
Alumni of the Central School of Art and Design
Alumni of the Royal College of Art
British women academics
English women painters
Royal Academicians